The black-headed shrike-babbler (Pteruthius rufiventer) is a bird species traditionally placed with the Old World babblers in the family Timaliidae. However, it might be one of the few Eurasian vireos (Vireonidae).

It is found in an area that ranges from eastern Nepal to northwestern Vietnam. Its natural habitat is subtropical or tropical moist montane forests.

References

black-headed shrike-babbler
Birds of Bhutan
Birds of Northeast India
Birds of Yunnan
black-headed shrike-babbler
black-headed shrike-babbler
Taxonomy articles created by Polbot